The 2020–21 Liga de Expansión MX season is the first professional season of the second-tier football division in Mexico. The season is divided into two championships—the Torneo Apertura and the Torneo Clausura—each in an identical format and each contested by the same sixteen teams. The Apertura tournament started on 18 August 2020 and concluded on 20 December 2020. The Clausura tournament started on 12 January 2021 and will conclude in May 2021.

Changes from the previous season
The Liga de Expansión MX is a Mexican football league founded in 2020 as part of the Mexican Football Federation's "Stabilization Project", which has the primary objective of rescuing the financially troubled teams from the Ascenso MX and prevent the disappearance of a second-tier league in Mexico, for which there will be no promotion and relegation during the following six years. The project also attempts for Liga MX and former Ascenso MX teams to consolidate stable projects with solid basis, sports-wise and administrative-wise, financially wise and in infrastructure. 

 Atlante F.C. was relocated from Cancún to Mexico City.
 Club Atlético Zacatepec was moved to Morelia and was renamed as Atlético Morelia.
 Cafetaleros de Chiapas was moved to Cancún and renamed as Cancún F.C.
 Tapatío and Pumas Tabasco, entered to the league as Liga MX affiliate teams.
 Tepatitlán F.C. and Tlaxcala F.C. were accepted as an expansion teams.

Stadiums and Locations

Personnel and kits

Managerial changes

Guardianes 2020
The Guardianes 2020 season was the 1st season of Liga de Expansión MX. The regular season began on 18 August 2020 and ended on 20 December 2020. The tournament was renamed Torneo Guardianes 2020 (stylized as Guard1anes) in honour of the job healthcare workers have done during the COVID-19 pandemic in Mexico

Regular season

Standings

Positions by Round

Results
Each team plays once all other teams in 15 rounds regardless of it being a home or away match.

Regular Season statistics

Top goalscorers 
Players sorted first by goals scored, then by last name.

Source:Liga de Expansión MX

Hat-tricks 

(H) – Home ; (A) – Away

Final phase

Reclassification

|}

Bracket

Quarter-finals

First leg

Second leg

Semi-finals

First leg

Second leg

Final

First leg

Second leg

Guardianes 2021
The Clausura tournament will be named Guardianes 2021, in honor of the doctors and health professionals in the country who fight against COVID-19.

The Clausura 2021 began on 12 January 2021. Tampico Madero are the defending champions.

Regular season

Standings

Positions by Round

Results
Each team plays once all other teams in 15 rounds regardless of it being a home or away match.

Regular Season statistics

Top goalscorers 
Players sorted first by goals scored, then by last name.

Source: Liga de Expansión MX

Hat-tricks

Attendance

Highest and lowest

Source: Liga Expansión MX

Final phase

Reclassification

|}

Bracket

Quarter-finals

First leg

Second leg

Semi-finals

First leg

Second leg

Final

First leg

Second leg

Campeón de Campeones Final

The Campeón de Campeones Final is a two-legged playoff between the winners of the Apertura and Clausura tournaments and the Liga de Expansión MX Super cup. The final would not be played if the same team wins both the Apertura and Clausura tournaments. The higher ranked team on the aggregate table for the 2020–21 season will play the second leg at home.
The winner of the final will receive a prize of $MXN 5 million.

First Leg

Second Leg

Coefficient table
As of the 2020–21 season, the promotion and relegation between Liga MX and Liga de Expansión MX (formerly known as Ascenso MX) was suspended, however, the coefficient table will be used to establish the payment of fines that will be used for the development of the clubs of the silver circuit. 

Per Article 24 of the competition regulations, the payment of $MXN3 million from Liga de Expansión clubs will be distributed among the last three positioned in the coefficient table as follows: Last place pays 1.5 million, the penultimate place pays 1 million, and the sixteenth place pays 500 thousand. If any affiliate club or new club from the Liga Premier is ranked in the bottom three at the end of the season, they are exempt from paying any fine and it will not be covered by any other club. Any club that does not pay their corresponding fine, for any reason, will be dissafiliated. The team that finishes last on the table will start the following season with a coefficient of zero. If the last ranked team repeats as the last ranked team in the 2021–22 season coefficient table, they will be fined an additional $MXN1 million.

Last update: 15 April 2021
 Rules for fine payment: 1) Fine coefficient; 2) Goal difference; 3) Number of goals scored; 4) Head-to-head results between tied teams; 5) Number of goals scored away; 6) Fair Play points
 F = Fined.
 Z = Points reset.
Source: Liga de Expansión

Aggregate table 
The Aggregate table is the general ranking for the 2020–21 season. This table is a sum of the Guardianes 2020 and Guardianes 2021 tournament standings. The aggregate table is used to determine seeding for the "Campeón de Campeones" Final.

References

See also 
2020–21 Liga MX season
2020–21 Liga MX Femenil season
2020–21 Liga Premier de México season

External links
 Official website of Liga de Expansión MX

1